Rafael Hugo Tabárez Hernández (born September 24, 1984 in Juan Lacaze, Uruguay) is a Uruguayan footballer currently playing for Progreso of the Primera División in Uruguay.

Teams
  Deportivo Colonia 2004
  Real Arroyo Seco 2005
  Rosario Puerto Belgrano de Punta Alta 2005
  Durazno 2006-2007
  Platense 2008
  Deportivo Colonia 2009
  Platense 2009-2010
  Henan Jianye 2010
  Platense 2010-2011
  SC Rio Grande 2011
  Progreso 2011–present

References
 
 
 Profile at Tenfield Digital 

1984 births
Living people
People from Juan Lacaze
Uruguayan footballers
Uruguayan expatriate footballers
C.A. Progreso players
Deportivo Colonia players
Real Arroyo Seco footballers
Club Atlético Platense footballers
Expatriate footballers in Argentina
Expatriate footballers in Brazil
Expatriate footballers in China
Association football defenders